The paradise fish, paradise-fish,  paradisefish, or paradise gourami (Macropodus opercularis) is a species of gourami found in most types of fresh water in East Asia, ranging from the Korean Peninsula to northern Vietnam.
Paradise gouramis were one of the first ornamental fish available to western aquarium keepers, having been imported 1869 to France by the French aquarium fish importer Pierre Carbonnier in Paris.  The paradise fish is one of the more aggressive members of its family. It is more aggressive than the three spot gourami, yet less pugnacious in nature than the less commonly kept combtail.

Behaviour

Paradise fish are fairly combative, harassing and attacking each other, as well as potentially assaulting and killing small fish. During a fight, the paradise fish will often change its color, usually displaying dark blue lateral lines on the sides of their bodies; extend its fins; and spread out its operculum. Paradise fish are more likely to show aggressive behavior towards other paradise fish than to fish of a different species. Acts of aggression tend to increase as the distance to the fish's home in Asia increases. In the wild, they are predators, eating insects, invertebrates, and fish fry. The popularity of this species has waned in recent decades as much more colorful (and often less abusive) species of gouramis have become widely available to hobbyists. This species is one of the few fish that can change its color (lighter or darker) in response to stimuli. It also appears that paradise fish are capable of learning through a type of restrictive process. Most forms of active teaching seem to hinder the paradise fish's ability to learn the movements of its owner via careful observation.

Habitat and diet
Paradise fish are tolerant of a wide range of water conditions, surviving in cool and warm waters alike. In the wild, they are most commonly found in shallow water containing dense vegetation, such as a marsh or rice field.
However they can be kept in outdoor ponds, or even the simplest of unheated aquaria. They will accept virtually any food, but should be given a reasonably high-protein diet (as opposed to vegetable-based foods.) They also eat mosquito larvae, black worms, brine shrimp, and small flies.

Disease control

In Taiwan, the native populations of paradise fish have been reduced to low levels by pollution in the rivers, and are now listed as a threatened species. The local population of yellow fever mosquitoes (Aedes aegypti) has since increased in the absence of one of its main predators. The infection rate for dengue fever has subsequently increased in the human population, caused in part by to the lack of natural mosquito predators.

Paradise fish are also considered to be an ideal subject for behavioral genetic studies and have been used to study Iridoviridae type viruses.

In home aquaria

Male paradise fish should be kept apart, since they will fight aggressively by locking jaws. A male can be kept with females; females may also be kept together in groups. The tank should be well planted and covered; bogwood and rockwork may be included.

Paradise fish tankmates must be chosen with care. Suitable ones include giant danios, large tetras, most smaller catfishes, and even some of the less aggressive cichlids, such as firemouth cichlids.  Slow-moving or long-finned fish such as fancy goldfish and freshwater angelfish are likely to be attacked by males; bettas and gouramis may also be victimized due to their resemblance to paradise fish. Male paradise fish may also attempt to court female bettas and gouramis.

If kept with significantly larger but non-aggressive fish, such as Geophagus cichlids, large Synodontis catfishes, or larger gouramis, they are usually submissive and do not act nearly as abusively as when they are the dominant species in the aquarium. However, they themselves can be bullied by similar sized or even smaller fish if that fish has already established territory in the tank which it is not willing to share or give up. If this is the case they will not even attempt to fight and will take to hiding behind filters, plants, or in décor, and will succumb to stress eating and diarrhoea.

Reproduction

As is typical of most bettas and gouramis, spawning involves a male building a bubble nest (a floating mat of saliva-coated air bubbles, often incorporating plant matter) and attracting a female to it. If the female accepts the male's advances, the fish will 'embrace' in open water, releasing both eggs and sperm into the water. The male gathers the fertilized eggs after each embrace, spitting them up into the bubble nest.  After spawning, the male may violently attack his mate or any other fish that might approach the new fertilized eggs or hatched fry, which are both a common source of food in the natural habitat. A breeder usually chooses to move the female to a separate tank to improve the chances of survival of both the female and the hatched fry. After the fry have begun to swim freely, the male's protective behavior subsides, so the breeder removes the male for the protection of the fry, and they are raised on infusoria or newly hatched brine shrimp.

An albino form of Macropodus opercularis is available. Many aquarists consider this form to be less aggressive than the wild type, but also less hardy, having more trouble with low temperatures.

References

External links

Macropodus
Fish of East Asia
Freshwater fish of Taiwan
Fauna of Hong Kong
paradise fish
paradise fish